Syed Yahya Shah سيد يحي (also called Aga Yahya) was a Pakistani politician and scholar from Gilgit-Baltistan.

Early life
Shah was born in Minapin, Nagar District of Gilgit-Baltistan Pakistan. He acquired his early education in Nomal and Gilgit, and attended high school in Astor and Kashmir. He then studied at Edwardes College in Peshawar. On return to Gilgit he taught at High School Gilgit. Syed Yahya Shah passed away on Sunday 11 April 2021 at 3:45 AM DHQ Hospital Gilgit.

Political career
The people of Nagar elected him to become the first elected Member of Legislative Assembly of Gilgit–Baltistan from Nagar.

He actively played a role in making Hunza–Nagar a District in Gilgit–Baltistan.

Charity work

In addition to his political career, Syed Yahya worked as pioneer nature conservation activist in Gilgit–Baltistan. He was the first person to introduce Trophy Hunting Programme(THP) in Bar Valley in Nagar, which was supported by IUCN, WWF and Government of Pakistan and replicated by other communities and villages of Gilgit–Baltistan. He saved several snow leopards in Nagar when they were caught to kill by villagers.

Syed has also worked on various charity projects to improve his home region. He initiated the connecting a warm spring in Diater Mountains in the Karakoram to Bar Valley in Nagar in collaboration with WWF which not only saved fuel energy but also decreased diseases in women caused by the washing of clothes in cold water during cold weather. As Minapin Community Leader, in Minapin village he motivated Aga Khan Rural Support Programme to initiate a project which restored a deserted mountain called Khaiadar where the canal irrigating to the pastures and agricultural fields at this mountain was cut off from the source of water-glacier by climate changed recession of glacier. He led the community to install a pipeline which reconnected broken water channel after 150 years of desertification. Syed Yahya Shah participated in a historical documentation of customary laws in nature conservation in Gilgit–Baltistan, a project of IUCN and the government of Pakistan.

Awards
Syed Yahya Shah was awarded The Quid-e- Azam Award by Aga Khan Rural Support Programme for his social work. Awarded Asad Ali shah award by WWF in 2011 in Lahore on his great contribution on saving wild life.

Publications
Broshaal Ke Qabail (Published by North News Agency)
Touzeeh-ul-Wasail (Published by AKRSP Gilgit)
Broshaal (Published by AKRSP Gilgit)
Gilgit–Baltistan Ke Namwar Khawatin (Published by Hanisara, Gilgit)

References 

 
 
 Conservation efforts in Northern Areas
 Conservation efforts in Northern Areas
 
 IUCN -

External links 
Dawn
Daily Times
 Pamir Times
Snow Leopard Network
Institute of Current World Affairs
WWF-Pakistan
WWF-Trophy Hunting in Pakistan
DAWN-Magazine-Environment
 DAWN-Magazine-Endangered Species
IUCN -Northern Areas Strategy for Sustainable Development-
HKKH-Partnership

1920s births
Year of birth uncertain
2021 deaths
People from Hunza-Nagar District
Pakistani conservationists
Pakistani nature writers
Pakistani politicians
People from Gilgit-Baltistan
Members of the Gilgit-Baltistan Legislative Assembly